Clifford Henry Frazier (23 November 1952 – 17 August 2014) was an American football player and actor.   Born in St. Louis, Missouri, he was a defensive tackle for the Kansas City Chiefs, starting 12 of 14 games for the Chiefs in 1977.  He had played college football for the UCLA Bruins, where he was a member of their 1976 Rose Bowl Game championship team.  He was selected for the College All-Star Game after his senior year.

Frazier was the 41st pick in the 2nd round of the 1976 NFL draft by the Chiefs.  He was traded to the Philadelphia Eagles before the 1976 season in exchange for two future draft picks.  The Eagles traded him to the Los Angeles Rams after the season, but the Rams cut him.  The Chiefs re-signed him before the 1977 season.  After one season with the Chiefs, Frazier decided to retire.

After retiring from professional football, Frazier had roles in several films, including North Dallas Forty, Vice Squad and House Party.  He played the character of Jethro Snell in 79 (of 80) episodes of HBO's football comedy 1st & 10 between 1984 and 1991.

References

External links
 
 Obituary in The Kansas City Star

1952 births
2014 deaths
American football defensive tackles
Kansas City Chiefs players
Philadelphia Eagles players
UCLA Bruins football players
Players of American football from St. Louis